Lake Galena is a reservoir in Jo Daviess County, Illinois, located near Galena.

History 
The lake formed following the damming of Smallpox Creek in 1974.  Smallpox Creek is one of many tributaries of the Mississippi River.

Geography 
It is located within a private development of Galena known as the Galena Territory.

Use 
The lake is mostly used for recreational purposes including boating and fishing. The lake is managed by a non-profit corporation, The Galena Territory Association, who manages a marina located on the east end of the lake.  The eighth hole on the Eagle Ridge Resort & Spa's North golf course crosses a small inlet of the lake.

See also 
 Galena River
 List of lakes in Illinois

Bibliography

Further reading 
 Shirk, M. (1995). Super Family Vacations, 3rd Edition: Resort and Adventure Guide. New York: HarperResource.

Notes 

Galena, Lake
Protected areas of Jo Daviess County, Illinois
Galena, Illinois
Bodies of water of Jo Daviess County, Illinois
1974 establishments in Illinois